Janusz Szpotański, (pen names Władysław Gnomacki, Aleksander Oniegow; 12 January 1929 in Warsaw – 13 October 2001 in Warsaw), was a Polish poet, satirist, critic, translator, literary theorist and chess player (a three times chess champion of Warsaw, he also held a nationwide title of Master).

He was the creator of satirical tragi-comedic poems which ridiculed the communist government of Poland. These works were often written in an absurdist, grotesque style, and specifically lampooned prominent members of the Polish communist party, as well as the general "low life" mentality of the average Communist Party member.

He is best known for creating the character of "Towarzysz Szmaciak" (literally: Comrade Dishrag, but idiomatically Comrade Cretin or Comrade Scumbag) - an uneducated, dull, cynical, sadistic, anti-semitic and stupid individual who supported the communist party out of opportunistic, not ideological motives. The metaphor of a "dishrag" alludes to the fact that individuals of this kind, while forming the support base of communism in Poland at the time, where considered useful by the party elite (much like a dishrag is necessary to clean up dirt) but at the same time despised by them (since the dishrag itself is dirty). For ridiculing Władysław Gomułka in his poem "Cisi i gęgacze" (The Silent and the Blabbers) he was arrested in 1967 and in 1968 sentenced to three years in prison on the charge of "spreading information harmful to the interests of state". During the March events of 1968, Gomułka referred to him in several of his official speeches, calling him "a man with a mentality of a pimp" and referring to his work as "reactionary doggerel" which "breathed with poisonous sadistic venom against our (communist) authority".

Szpotański was a member of the Stowarzyszenie Pisarzy Polskich (Union of Polish Writers).

On 23 September 2006 he was posthumously awarded the Polonia Restituta Commander's Cross by President of Poland, Lech Kaczyński.

Works
Cisi i gęgacze czyli bal u prezydenta, 1964
Targowica czyli opera Gnoma (poświęcona obchodom milenijnym), 1966
Ballada o cudzie na Woli: W Warszawie na Woli ukazał się duch Bieruta i sprzedawał kiełbasę po 26 zł za kilo, 1966
Lament Wysokiego Dygnitarza, 1966
Ballada o Łupaszcze, 1968
Rozmowa z Kartoflami, 1968
Gnomiada, 1976
Caryca i Zwierciadło, 1974
Towarzysz Szmaciak, 1977
Szmaciak w Mundurze, Czyli Wojna Pcimska, 1983
Sen Towarzysza Szmaciaka, 1984
Bania w Paryżu (Unfinished), 1974-1979

References

Dziennik Teatralny, "Zmarł Janusz Szpotański", 10/5/2001, 
Antoni Libera, ed. "Janusz Szpotański, Fragmenty nienapisanej biografii" (Janusz Szpotański, Fragments of an unwritten biography), 
Janusz Szpotański, "Utwory Zebrane" (Collected Works),  

1929 births
2001 deaths
20th-century Polish poets
20th-century Polish male writers